The RCA Albums Collection is a 17-disc compilation album dedicated to American singer-songwriter Harry Nilsson. It was released in July 2013 by Legacy Recordings. The album includes 14 of Nilsson's solo albums from the 1960s and 1970s and three CDs worth of unreleased session recordings.

Assembled by Andrew Sandoval and Rob Santos the set includes 11 of Nilsson's albums remastered by Vic Anesini. The three albums not remastered for this set were mastered by Anesini and include The Point, Nilsson Schmilsson and Son of Schmilsson. The set includes each album in mini-cardboard replicas of the original vinyl packaging. Nilsson's first two albums include both mono and stereo mixes of the respective tracks with the mono tracks receiving their first CD release.

Missing from this set are the albums Son of Dracula (as, with the exception of the song "Daybreak" and the snippets of dialogue, all its tracks had previously been released on other albums or singles), the instrumental portion of the soundtrack Skidoo, plus Spotlight on Nilsson, Flash Harry, Losst and Founnd, and the soundtrack to the film Popeye (the last 4 had been released on different labels).

The boxed set includes a booklet with brief comments on each album, full credits and rare pictures.

Track listing

References

2013 compilation albums
Harry Nilsson albums
Legacy Recordings compilation albums